North Mount Lyell  was the name of a mine, mining company, locality (sometimes as North Lyell) and former railway north of Gormanston on the southern slopes of Mount Lyell in the West Coast Range on the West Coast of Tasmania, and on to the ridge between Mount Lyell and Mount Owen.

North Mount Lyell Copper Company

The company was short-lived, however the mine, orebody and workings lasted long after the company was absorbed into the workings of the Mount Lyell Mining and Railway Company following the failure of the smelters at Crotty.

The stages of building the infrastructure of the mines, the smelters, and port at Kelly Basin were photographed by John Watt Beattie.

Founder
The company was founded by James Crotty, and was for a few years a fierce competitor with Mount Lyell. Geoffrey Blainey gives a description of the rivalry and final amalgamation in The Peaks of Lyell. As Blainey points out, the North Mount Lyell workings eventually proved vital for the Mount Lyell Company.

Establishments
During Crotty's establishment of the company and its operations the company had:

 The North Mount Lyell mine on its lease adjacent and east of the Mount Lyell Mining and Railway Company leases
 Shipping
 Port and railway terminus at Kelly Basin and Pillinger, Tasmania
 Smelter and town at Crotty, Tasmania at the eastern foot of Mount Jukes and just south of the King River, Tasmania 
 Railway terminus at Linda, Tasmania
 Aerial ropeway between North Lyell mine and Linda
 North Mount Lyell Railway

1912 disaster
The 1912 North Mount Lyell Disaster is also found in Blainey's work, but for decades later there were divergent and popular accounts from the official reports that followed.

Locality
The North Lyell locality (at which some of the workers killed in the disaster had addresses) was eventually overtaken by the Mount Lyell mine workings.  A rare photo of the locality is in Blainey's book.

20th century output
The development of the Mount Lyell mine depended upon the resources of the North Lyell orebody and workings well into the late twentieth century.

Notes

See also
 Railways on the West Coast of Tasmania
 West Coast Tasmania Mines

Underground mines in Australia
Mount Lyell Mining and Railway Company
West Coast Range
North Mount Lyell Railway
1903 disestablishments in Australia
Defunct mining companies of Australia
Copper mines in Tasmania